Garbów may refer to the following places:
Garbów, Kutno County in Łódź Voivodeship (central Poland)
Garbów, Łódź East County in Łódź Voivodeship (central Poland)
Garbów in Lublin Voivodeship (east Poland)
Garbów, Sieradz County in Łódź Voivodeship (central Poland)
Garbów, Opole Voivodeship (south-west Poland)